Chris is a short form of various names including Christopher, Christian, Christina, Christine, and Christos.  Chris is also used as a name in its own right, however it is not as common.

People with the given name
Chris Abani (born 1966), Nigerian author
Chris Abrahams (born 1961), Sydney-based jazz pianist
Chris Adams (disambiguation), multiple people
Chris Adcock (born 1989), English internationally elite badminton player
Chris Albright (born 1979), American former soccer player 
Chris Alcaide (1923–2004), American actor
Chris Amon (1943–2016), former New Zealand motor racing driver
Chris Andersen (born 1978), American basketball player
Chris Anderson (disambiguation), multiple people
Chris Angel (wrestler) (born 1982), Puerto Rican professional wrestler
Chris Anker Sørensen (born 1984), Danish cycler
Chris Anstey (born 1975), Australian basketball player
Chris Anthony, American voice actress
Chris Antley (1966–2000), champion American jockey
Chris Archer (born 1988), American baseball player
Chris Arreola (born 1981), American professional boxer
Chris Ashworth (born 1975), American actor
Chris Ashworth (artist), English graphic designer
Chris Axworthy (born 1947), Canadian politician and academic
Chris Baillie (politician) (born 1961 or 1962), New Zealand politician
Chris Ballard (politician), former politician in Ontario, Canada
Chris Ballew (born 1965), American musician 
Chris Bassitt (born 1989), American baseball player
Chris Beard (disambiguation), several people
Chris Beardsley (born 1984), English footballer
Chris Beckett (born 1955), British social worker, university lecturer, and science fiction author
Chris Bell (disambiguation), multiple people
Chris Bellard (born 1979), real name of American rapper Young Maylay
Chris Bender (film producer) (born 1971), American film producer
Chris Benoit (1967–2007), Canadian professional wrestler
Chris Bey (born 1996), American professional wrestler 
Chris Bianco, American celebrity chef 
Chris Bickford, Canadian actor who was a cast member on the Canadian sketch comedy TV series You Can't Do That on Television
Chris Bittle (born 1979), Canadian Liberal politician
Chris Board (born 1995), American football player
Chris Bolt, British economist
Chris Bosh (wrestler), American retired professional wrestler
Chris Botti (born 1962), American trumpeter and composer
Chris Braithwaite (1885–1944), black Barbadian
Chris Brown (disambiguation), multiple people
Chris Brubeck, American musician and composer
Chris Bryan (born 1982), former sportsman 
Chris Burke (actor) (born August 26, 1965), American actor
Chris Butler (filmmaker) (born 1974), English storyboard artist
Chris Butler (private investigator), American private investigator
Chris Campbell (cornerback) (born 1995), American football player
Chris Candido (1972–2005), American professional wrestler
Chris Carmack (born 1980), American actor and singer
Chris Carter (disambiguation), multiple people
Chris Carson (born 1994), American football player
Chris Champion (1961–2018), American professional wrestler
Chris Chandler (born 1960), American former football player
Chris Chaney (born 1970), American musician
Chris Chatterton (born 1982), English illustrator and animator
Chris Chavis, real name for American retired professional wrestler Tatanka (born 1961)
Chris Cheek (born 1968), American jazz saxophonist
Chris Chelios (born 1962), American former professional ice hockey defenseman
Chris Cheney (born 1975), Australian rock musician
Chris Chetti (born 1974), American professional wrestler
Chris Christie (born 1962), former Governor of New Jersey
Chris Clark (writer) (born 1945/6), British author
Chris Claybrooks (born 1998), American football player
Chris Colfer (born 1990), American actor
Chris Columbus (filmmaker) (born 1958), American movie director and screenwriter
Chris Columbus (musician) (1902–2002), American jazz drummer
Chris Cooper (disambiguation), multiple people
Chris Corbould (born 1958), British special effects coordinator
Chris Cornell (1964–2017), American musician and songwriter
Chris Covington (born 1996), American football player
Chris Croft, American politician
Chris Cron (born 1964), American baseball player and coach
Chris Cuomo (born 1970), television journalist 
Chris Cuomo (philosopher), Professor of Philosophy and Women's Studies
Chris Cuthbert (born 1957), Canadian sportscaster
Chris Dainty, Canadian artist and animator 
Chris Daugherty (born 1970), American construction worker and reality TV personality
Chris Daughtry (born 1979), American singer, musician, and actor
Chris Davis (disambiguation), multiple people
Chris D'Elia (born 1980), American stand-up comedian
Chris Denning (born 1941), British radio presenter and convicted sex offender
Chris Devenski (born 1990), American baseball player
Chris Dickinson (wrestler) (born 1987), American professional wrestler
Chris Difford (born 1954), English singer, musician, songwriter, and record producer
Chris Distefano (born 1984), American comedian
Chris Dixon (born 1972), American internet entrepreneur
Chris Dodd (born 1944), American lobbyist and politician
Chris Duffy (wrestler) (1965–2000), American professional wrestler 
Chris Dunk (born 1958), American tennis player
Chris Dwyer (born 1988), American baseball pitcher
Chris Dyson (born 1978), American racing driver
Chris Eagles (born 1985), English footballer
Chris Elliott (born 1960), American actor, comedian, and writer
Chris Ellis (disambiguation), multiple people
Chris Ensminger (born 1973), American basketball coach and former player
Chris Eubank (born 1966), British former professional boxer
Chris Eubank Jr. (born 1989), British professional boxer
Chris Evans (disambiguation), multiple people
Chris Evert (born 1954), American tennis player
Chris Farley (1964–1997), American actor and comedian
Chris Fehn, American musician
Chris Fetter (born 1985), American baseball coach
Chris Fischer, American chef and farmer from Martha's Vineyard, Massachusetts
Chris Flexen (born 1994), American baseball player
Chris Frantz (born 1951), American musician and record producer
Chris Freeland (born 1969), American politician
Chris Froome (born 1985), winner of the 2013 and 2015 Tour de France
Chris Fryar (born 1970), American drummer
Chris Fuller (director) (born 1982), American Filmmaker
Chris Gall (born 1975), German jazz pianist and composer
Chris Gardner (disambiguation), several people
Chris Garia (born 1992), Curaçao sprinter and former baseball player
Chris Garrett (disambiguation), multiple people
Chris Geith, American composer and arranger of contemporary jazz and New Age music
Chris Godwin (born 1996), American football player
Chris Gragg (born 1990), American football player
Chris Hadfield (born 1959), Canadian astronaut
Chris Hallam (1962–2013), Welsh Paralympian and wheelchair athlete
Chris Hamrick (born 1966), American professional wrestler
Chris Harper (disambiguation), multiple people
Chris Harris (wrestler) (born 1973), American professional wrestler
Chris Hemsworth (born 1983), Australian actor
Chris Henchy, American screenwriter and producer
Chris Herndon (born 1996), American football player
Chris Hero (born 1979), American professional wrestler
Chris Hogan (disambiguation), several people
Chris Holt (disambiguation), several people
Chris Hook (born 1968), American baseball player and coach
Chris Hubbard (born 1991), American football player
Chris Hyndman (1966–2015), Canadian interior decorator and television personality
Chris Iannetta (born 1983), American professional baseball player
Chris Irwin (born 1942), British former racing driver
Chris Isaac (1959–2020), American professional football player 
Chris Isaak (born 1956), American singer, songwriter, guitarist and occasional actor
Chris Ivory (born 1988), American former football running back
Chris Jackson (disambiguation), multiple people
Chris Jagger (born 1947), English musician and the younger brother of rock star Mick Jagger
Chris James (disambiguation), multiple people
Chris Jansen (born 1966), Dutch politician
Chris Janson (born 1986), American singer and songwriter
Chris Jericho (born 1970), American-Canadian professional wrestler
Chris Kanyon (1970–2010), American professional wrestler
Chris Kattan  (born 1970), American actor, comedian, and author
Chris Kenner (1929–1976), American New Orleans-based R&B singer and songwriter
Chris Kirkpatrick (born 1971), American singer and actor
Chris Kläfford (born 1989), Swedish singer
Chris Klug (born 1972), American snowboarder
Chris Kratt (born 1969), American television host
Chris Kreski (1962–2005), American writer, biographer and screenwriter
Chris Kyle (1974–2013), American naval sniper
Chris Lacy (born 1996), American football player
Chris Landreth (born 1961), American animator
Chris Langham (born 1949), English writer
Chris Larkin (born 1967), English actor
Chris Lawrence (disambiguation), multiple people
Chris Lea, designer, politician, and political activist in Canada
Chris Leary, national television and radio show personality
Chris Leben (born 1980), American mixed martial artist
Chris Chan Lee, American filmmaker
Chris Lemmon (born 1954), American actor and author
Chris Lincoln (born 1947), American sportscaster 
Chris Lindstrom (born 1997), American football player
Chris Lowe (born 1959), English musician
Chris MacFarland (born 1970), American ice hockey executive
Chris Madsen (1851–1944), American lawman of the Old West 
Chris Madsen (musician) (born 1954), Canadian singer, songwriter, teacher, and writer 
Chris Makepeace (born 1964), Canadian former actor
Chris Mannella (born 1994), Canadian soccer player
Chris Markoff, Yugoslav-American retired professional wrestler
Chris Marquette (born 1984), American actor
Chris Martin (disambiguation), multiple people
Chris Masters (born 1983), American professional wrestler
Chris Mazza (born 1989), American baseball player
Chris McCandless (1968–1992), American hiker
Chris McDuffie, American musician
Chris McKhool (born 1968), Canadian violinist, producer, guitarist, composer, and singer-songwriter
Chris McNair (1925-2019), American businessman and politician
Chris McQueen (born 1987), Australian rugby league player
Chris Meledandri (born 1959), American film producer and CEO of Illumination
Chris Melendez (born 1987), American professional wrestler 
Chris Michaels (born 1961), American professional wrestler
Chris Minns  (born 1979), Australian politician
Chris Montez (born 1943), American guitarist
Chris Murphy (disambiguation), multiple people
Chris Myarick (born 1995), American football player
Chris Niosi (born 1988), American animator, producer, and voice actor
Chris Norman (disambiguation), several people
Chris Noth (born 1954), American actor
Chris Odom (born 1994), American football player
Chris O'Dowd (born 1979), Irish actor and comedian
Chris Okey (born 1994), American baseball player
Chris Oladokun (born 1997), American football player
Chris O'Loughlin (born 1967), American Olympic fencer
Chris Olson (ice hockey) (born 1964), American former professional ice hockey goaltender 
Chris O'Neill (YouTuber) (born 1990), Irish YouTuber, animator, voice actor, musician, and video game designer
Chris Owings (born 1991), American professional baseball player
Chris Oxspring (born 1977), Australian former professional baseball player
Chris Packham (born 1961), English naturalist, nature photographer, television presenter and author
Chris Paddack (born 1996), American baseball player
Chris Pang (born 1984), Australian actor and producer
Chris Parker (disambiguation), multiple people
Chris Parnell (born 1967), American actor
Chris Paul (born 1985), American basketball player
Chris Paul (American football) (born 1998), American football player
Chris Peace (American football) (born 1996), American football player
Chris Penn (1965–2006), American actor
Chris Perez (disambiguation), multiple people
Chris Pine (born 1980), American actor
Chris Pitman (born 1961), American musician
Chris Pontius (born 1974), American actor
Chris Potter (actor) (born 1960), Canadian actor, musician and pitchman
Chris Potter (jazz saxophonist) (born 1971), American jazz saxophonist, composer, and multi-instrumentalist
Chris Potter (record producer), British music producer and mixer
Chris Potter (priest) (born 1969), Dean of St Asaph
Chris Pratt (born 1979), American actor
Chris Prieto (born 1972), American baseball player and coach
Chris Pronger (born 1974), Canadian former professional ice hockey defenceman
Chris Pyne (1939–1995), English jazz trombonist
Chris Quick (born 1988), Scottish film producer
Chris Quilala, American Christian musician and worship leader 
Chris Ramsay, American magician and YouTuber
Chris Ramsey (disambiguation), multiple people
Chris Rea (born 1951), English rock and blues singer and guitarist 
Chris Rea (rugby union) (born 1943), Scotland former international rugby union player
Chris Reed (disambiguation), multiple people
Chris Reeve (born 1953), South African-American knife maker
Chris Rock (born 1965), American comedian and actor
Chris Rodriguez Jr. (born 2000), American football player
Chris Rosenberg (1950–1979), American member of the DeMeo crew
Chris Rowland (born 1997), American football player
Chris Rowley (born 1990), American baseball player
Chris Rudge (born 1945), Canadian business executive
Chris Rumph (born 1971), American football coach
Chris Rumph II (born 1998), American football player
Chris Sabburg (born 1990), Australian cricketer
Chris Sabin (born 1982), American professional wrestler
Chris Sale (born 1989), American baseball player
Chris Salvi (born 1989), American football player
Chris Sandow (born 1989), Indigenous Australian rugby league player
Chris Sarandon (born 1942), American actor
Chris Sauve, Canadian animator
Chris Savino (born 1971), American cartoon animator
Chris Schenkel (1923–2005), American sportscaster
Chris Schultz (1960–2021), Canadian professional football player 
Chris Seitz (born 1987), American former soccer player
Chris Slayton (born 1995), American football player
Chris Smalls, American labor organizer
Chris Smith (disambiguation), multiple people
Chris Snyder (born 1981), American baseball player
Chris Snyder (American football) (born 1974), American football player
Chris Soteros, Canadian mathematician
Chris Spedding (born 1944), English musician, singer, guitarist, songwriter, multi-instrumentalist, composer, Womble and record producer
Chris Stack, American actor
Chris Stapleton (born 1978), American singer-songwriter and guitarist
Chris Stark (born 1987), British radio personality
Chris Starkjohann (born 1956), American golfer
Chris Staros, American comic book publisher
Chris Stein (born 1950), American musician and photographer
Chris Stout (born 1984), Scottish fiddle player
Chris Stratton (born 1990), American baseball player
Chris Streveler (born 1995), American football player
Chris Stuckmann (born 1988), American film critic
Chris Sununu (born 1974), American politician
Chris Tamer (born 1970), American ice hockey player
Chris Taylor (disambiguation), multiple people
Chris Tomlin (born 1972), American musician
Chris Terrio (born 1976), American screenwriter and film director
Chris Thomas (born 1947), English record producer
Chris Thomas Devlin, American screenwriter
Chris Tolos (1929–2005), Canadian professional wrestler
Chris Tordoff, English-born Irish comedian, actor, writer, YouTuber, and live streamer
Chris Tucker (born 1971), American actor and comedian
Chris Valaika (born 1985), American baseball player and coach
Chris Van Vliet (born 1983), Canadian television/radio personality
Chris Von Erich (1969–1991), American professional wrestler
Chris Vrenna (born 1967), American musician
Chris Waddell (born 1968), American Paralympic sit-skier and wheelchair track athlete
Chris Waddle (born 1960), English former professional football player and manager
Chris Wade (disambiguation), multiple people
Chris Walker (disambiguation), multiple people
Chris Ware (born 1967), American cartoonist
Chris Warren III (born 1996), American football player
Chris Watson (disambiguation), multiple people
Chris Webber (disambiguation), several people
Chris Weidman (born 1984), American mixed martial artist
Chris Weitz (born 1969), American producer, writer, director, and actor
Chris Westry (born 1997), American football player
Chris Whitecross, Canadian lieutenant-general
Chris Wiggins, associate professor of applied mathematics at Columbia University
Chris Wiggins (1931–2017), English-born Canadian actor
Chris Wilcox (born 1982), American basketball player
Chris Wilcox (American football) (born 1997), American football player
Chris Wilder (born 1967), English professional football manager and former player
Chris Williams (disambiguation), multiple people
Chris Williamson (disambiguation), multiple people
Chris Wilson (disambiguation), multiple people
Chris Wolstenholme (born 1978), English musician
Chris Woodruff (born 1973), American tennis player
Chris Woods (disambiguation), multiple people
Chris Woodward (born 1976), American former professional baseball utility player and coach
Chris Worley (born 1995), American football player
Chris Wormley (born 1993), American football player
Chris Young (disambiguation), multiple people
Chris Youngblood (1966–2021), American professional wrestler
Chris Zachary (1944–2003), American professional baseball pitcher

Fictional characters 
 Chris Bradley, a character from the X-Men comic books published my Marvel Comics and first appeared in the comic book series X-Men Unlimited
 Chris Chambers, a character in the 1986 American coming-of-age movie Stand by Me played by River Phoenix
 Chris Collins, a character in the 1990 American natural horror comedy movie Arachnophobia
 Chris Farber, a character in the 1994 American TV miniseries V The Final Battle
 Chris, a character played by Christian Tessier in the 1996 movie Natural Enemy
 Chris Finch,  a character from the American television series The Office
 Chris Fuller, a character in the American fantasy sitcom Out of This World
 Chris Grandy in the movie 13 Going on 30 
 Chris Griffen, a character from the 2006 film We Are Marshall
 Chris Griffin, a character from Family Guy
 Chris Halliwell, a character from the supernatural TV series Charmed
 Chris Hammond, a character from the 1987 American fantasy-comedy movie Like Father Like Son
 Chris Hayden, a character from the 1974 film Black Christmas
 Chris Hillard, a character from the 1993 American comedy-drama film Mrs. Doubtfire
 Chris Hughes, a character from the 2010 film The Social Network
 Chris Johnston, the main character from the 2003 film Timeline
 Chris Keller, a character from the American TV series Oz
 Chris Keller, a character from the American TV series One Tree Hill
 Christopher "Chris" Kirkman, a character in Bravest Warriors
 Chris Kruger, the main character from the 2005 film Jarhead
 Chris Kyle, a character from the 2014 film American Sniper
 Chris Lloyd, a character from the 1985 film Target
 Chris MacNeil, a character from the 1971 novel The Exorcist and its franchise
 Chris McLean, a character from Total Drama
 Chris Miller, a character in the 1986 American fantasy drama film The Barker
 Christopher "Chris" Myers, character from the 2016 film The Promise
 Chris "Oz" Ostreicher, a character from the 1999 film American Pie and its 2001 sequel
 Chris Pappas, a character from Neighbours
 Chris Parker, a character played by Elisabeth Shue in the 1987 American teen movie Adventures in Babysitting
 Chris Peterson, the main character from the American TV sitcom Get a Life (1990–1992)
 Chris Potter, fictional character on sitcom Kenan and Kel played by Dan Frischman
 Chris Pratt, a character from the 2007 film The Lookout
 Chris Redfield, a character from the Resident Evil franchise
 Chris Tate, character from the British ITV soap opera, Emmerdale
 Chris Thorndyke, a human boy in the Sonic X anime television series
 Christopher "Chris" Traeger, a character from the American TV series Parks and Recreation
 Chris Turner, a character in the 1993 TV series Journey to the Center of the Earth
 Chris 'Cav' Anton Vichon, a character from the 2002 film Brown Sugar
 Chris Warner, fictional character on the New Zealand soap opera Shortland Street
 Chris Wells, a character in the 2008 television movie The Nanny Express

Performance characters
 Cristiana Cucchi, Italian singer also known as Chris
 Héloïse Letissier (born 1 June 1988), French musician performing as Chris between 2018 and 2021

See also
 Chris (album) 
 Cris (disambiguation)
 Criss
 Crist (surname)
 Kris (name)

References

English-language masculine given names
English masculine given names
English feminine given names
English unisex given names
Hypocorisms
Unisex given names